The 1999 Beach Soccer World Championships was the fifth edition of the Beach Soccer World Championships, the most prestigious competition in international beach soccer contested by men's national teams until 2005, when the competition was then replaced by the second iteration of a world cup in beach soccer, the better known FIFA Beach Soccer World Cup. It was organised by Brazilian sports agency Koch Tavares (one of the founding partners of Beach Soccer Worldwide). 

The tournament continued to take place at Copacabana Beach in Rio de Janeiro, Brazil. 

Twelve teams (a record high at the time) took part for the first time, expanded for a second year running, from ten in 1998. This championship also saw an African nation participate for the first time (and only time pre-2005) making this the single pre-FIFA era world cup with the most continental representation, with all but Oceania represented by at least one nation competing in Rio.  

Brazil won their fifth title in a row by beating Portugal 5–2 in what was the Iberians' first final appearance.

Organisation
The number of teams competing this year was increased to twelve meaning a shift in organisation from previous years. 

The twelve nations were split into four groups of three who played each other in a round robin format. The top two teams then progressed to the quarter finals. With the increase in nations in this edition, this saw a quarter final stage introduced to the Championships for the first time. From the aforementioned round onward, the championship was played as a knock-out tournament until a winner was crowned, with an additional match to determine third place.

Teams
Africa was represented for the first time (and only time before FIFA took control of the world cup). Asia had two nations competing for the first time.

Oceania was unrepresented, the only continent to be so.

African Zone (1):
1

Asian Zone (2):

1

European Zone (4):

North American Zone (2):

South American Zone (2):

Hosts:
 (South America)
Notes:
1. Teams making their debut

Group stage

Group A

Group B

Group C

Group D

Knockout stage

Quarter finals

Semi-finals

Third place play-off

Final

Winners

Awards

Final standings

Sources

RSSSF
Roonba

1999
1999
1999 in beach soccer
1999 in Brazilian football